is a Japanese former football player.

Career
Yasumasa Kawasaki joined J1 League club Sanfrecce Hiroshima in 2015. On March 15, 2017, he debuted in J.League Cup (v Ventforet Kofu). In August, he moved to Yokohama FC.

On 16 January 2023, Kawasaki announcement officially retirement from football.

Club statistics
Updated to 1 March 2019.

Honours
Sanfrecce Hiroshima
 J1 League: 2015

References

External links
Profile at Yokohama FC

1992 births
Living people
Ryutsu Keizai University alumni
People from Ayase, Kanagawa
Association football people from Kanagawa Prefecture
Japanese footballers
J1 League players
J2 League players
J3 League players
Sanfrecce Hiroshima players
Yokohama FC players
Kataller Toyama players
SC Sagamihara players
Association football defenders